Matías Martín Jones Mourigian (born 1 July 1991) is a Uruguayan footballer who currently plays for Danubio.

Club career
Jones started his career playing with Danubio FC in the Uruguayan Top Division. He made his debut on 19 September 2009, on a 2-2 draw against River Plate.

In mid 2010 he was transferred to Eredivisie side FC Groningen. He scored his first goal in Netherlands on the 27 April 2012 against De Graafschap. He was never able to be part of the first eleven and therefore was sent on loan to FC Emmen.

In August 2013, both Groningen and Jones decided to dissolve his contract. Jones returned to Uruguay and signed a two-year contract with Defensor.

In August 2014, he went to Bogota to play for La Equidad. In October of that year he broke his shoulder with muscles and for this injury surgery was needed and he was out for 3,5 months.

After playing a half year for La Equidad he went in January 2015 to play for San Martín (San Juan) in San Juan, Argentina, again an accident happened while training and Matias broke in May 2015 his leg and needed undergoing surgery.

In January 2016, Jones returned again to his country, but now  to play for River Plate.

In February 2019, he returned to Netherlands to play for Eerste Divisie side SC Cambuur.

National
He has been capped by the Uruguay national under-20 football team for the 2011 South American Youth Championship and for the pre-squad for the 2011 FIFA U-20 World Cup.

References

External links

1991 births
Living people
Uruguayan footballers
Uruguayan people of British descent
Uruguay under-20 international footballers
Uruguayan expatriate footballers
Danubio F.C. players
FC Groningen players
FC Emmen players
Defensor Sporting players
La Equidad footballers
San Martín de San Juan footballers
Club Atlético River Plate (Montevideo) players
SC Cambuur players
Uruguayan Primera División players
Eredivisie players
Eerste Divisie players
Categoría Primera A players
Argentine Primera División players
Association football midfielders
Uruguayan expatriate sportspeople in Colombia
Uruguayan expatriate sportspeople in Argentina
Uruguayan expatriate sportspeople in the Netherlands
Expatriate footballers in Colombia
Expatriate footballers in Argentina
Expatriate footballers in the Netherlands